'Banda Carnaval' is a Mexican Latin Grammy nominated Banda from Mazatlán, Sinaloa, Mexico. The banda was named after “El Carnaval de Mazatlán” which is the biggest event that takes place every year in their hometown of Mazatlán. The Banda was formed by Jesús Tirado Castañeda in 2001.

Discography

2001: Entre Suspiro Y Suspiro
2008: Aqui Estamos
2010: Corridos Y Rancheras
2011: El Numero 1
2012: Maximo Nivel
2013: Las Vueltas De La Vida
2013: Puros Corridos
2014: La Historia De Mis Manos
2015: Hombre De Trabajo
2016: Corridos Y Rancheras En Vivo Desde Mazatlán, Sinaloa
2017: Como No Queriendo
2019:Porque Así Tenía Que Ser
2020:Desde el estudio andaluz

Awards

Latin Grammy Awards

|-
|2013
|Las Vueltas de la Vida
|Best Banda Album
| 
|-

References

External links 
Banda Carnaval Official Site
Facebook
Twitter
Youtube 

Mexican musical groups
Banda music groups
Universal Music Latin Entertainment artists
Musical groups from Sinaloa